The Sanfong Central Street or Sanfong Jhong Street is a street in Sanmin District, Kaohsiung, Taiwan. It is a traditional shopping area selling grocery goods and the largest grocery goods wholesale center in Kaohsiung.

History
Around a century ago, there was a river by the street through which the local merchants imported exotic foreign goods. The area used to be the place to sell sundry goods and agricultural produce. As the consumption style transformed, the area has evolved into an area to supply primarily on things needed for the Chinese New Year, in the types of grains, processed farm produce and candies.

Architecture
The street is 400 meters long with more than 100 shops.

Transportation
The street is accessible within walking distance west of Kaohsiung Station.

See also
List of roads in Taiwan

References

Streets in Taiwan
Retail markets in Taiwan
Transportation in Kaohsiung